Lund is a small town and census-designated place in White Pine County, Nevada, United States. The population of Lund as of 2020 was 211.

Etymology
Lund was named for Anthon H. Lund, a Mormon church official.

History

Lund was settled in 1898 on land that the United States government had given the Church of Jesus Christ of Latter-day Saints (Mormons) in lieu of land that had been confiscated under the Edmunds–Tucker Act. The first settlers were members of the Church of Jesus Christ of Latter-day Saints, and the Church still has a ward in Lund.

On June 24, 2020, the Brown Fire threatened Lund, resulting in residents on the south side being evacuated from their homes. Residents were allowed to return that evening.

Education
The co-located Lund Elementary School (K-5) and Lund High School (6-12) operate as Lund Combined Schools, part of the White Pine County School District. Lund Grade School, built in 1915, operated for 90 years until 2005. The school building was added to the National Register of Historic Places in 2018 after being nominated by local residents.

Transportation
Lund is served by Nevada State Route 318 which passes through the town.

Demographics

Climate

See also

 Mount Grafton Wilderness

References

External links

 Additional information available in the Web-book: White River Valley, Nevada -- Then and Now 1898-1980

Census-designated places in White Pine County, Nevada
Populated places established in 1898
The Church of Jesus Christ of Latter-day Saints in Nevada
Census-designated places in Nevada
Great Basin National Heritage Area